The 1978 World Lacrosse Championship was the third edition of the international men's lacrosse tournament.  The event took place at Edgeley Park in Stockport, England under the auspices of the International Lacrosse Federation. Four teams competed in the tournament: Australia, Canada, England, and the United States. Canada defeated the United States 17-16 in overtime in the final to win the tournament.

Overview
In the finals, Canada captured the 1978 World Championship with a shocking 17-16 overtime victory over the United States team.

The underdog label was given to the Canadian team due to their lack of field lacrosse experience, and also following a round-robin American annihilation of the Canadians, 28-4. However, two individuals with previous field experience would prove to be key factors in the longshot victory. Hall of Famers Stan Cockerton from North Carolina State and Mike French from Cornell had great tournaments. In the first game of the 1978 tournament, Cockerton whipped in seven goals with French adding three more plus seven assists to move past the host English squad 21-15.

The U.S. took Australia 22-17 the first day and then drubbed Canada 28-4. U.S. scored the first 14 goals even before French put Canada on the board; but the rout on the rain-drenched field continued - 17-2 at halftime and 22-3 after three periods. Meanwhile, Australia downed England 16-10. Down 4-3 early in game three against Australia, Canada whipped in six straight on the road to a 16-13 victory that set up a rematch with the Americans, who had narrowly squeaked past England 12-11.

The Americans opened the finals intent on repeating their earlier conquest of Canada with Cornell great Bill Marino rifling home a shot just 15 seconds after the opening faceoff. But Team Canada stunned the Americans with six unanswered goals to take an 8-4 lead after one period. The U.S. rallied to tie the contest and then moved ahead only to see Cockerton knot up the contest 16-16 with seconds remaining.

Stan Shillington wrote: "with the entire crowd of 3,500-plus chanting for the Canadians, both teams went through a scoreless overtime session and all but 20 seconds of a second extra period. That's when Cockerton scooped in the winner, his sixth goal of the game, that gave Canada a 17-16 victory."

Stan Cockerton led the tourney in scoring with 18 goals and 9 assists in the four games. Mike French, with 6 goals and 15 assists, was named the "Best and Fairest Player." Other awards were given to Bob Flintoff, Canada, Goalkeeper; Steve Bevington, England, Defender; John Butkiewicz, Australia, Midfielder; and Peter Cann, Australia, Attackman.

Australia beat England 19-9 for third place.

Results

Group

Standings

Third Place
Australia 19, England 9

Final

July 8, 1978

 Canada 17, United States 16 (OT)

Rosters

Canada
Goal: Bob Flintoff, Tim Barrie
Defense: Sandy Lynch, Carm Collins, Tom Briscoe, Brian Jones, Jim Branton, Murray Cawker
Midfield: Mike French, Fred Greenwood, Pat Differ, John Mouradian, Jim Calder, Ted Greves, Dave Huntley, Dan Wilson, Steve Mastine
Attack: Stan Cockerton, Dave Durante, Doug Hayes, Jim Wasson, Bob Burke, John Grant
Coaches: Bob Allan, Don Barrie, John McCauley
Manager: Ron Wicks

United States
Goal: Rick Blick, Dan Mackesey
Defense: Dave Devine, Chris Kane, Tom Keigler, Dom Starsia, Dennis Townsend, Mike Waldvogel
Midfield: Jim Darcangelo, Craig Jaeger, Skip Lichtfuss, Billy Marino, Phil Marino, Dave McNaney, Doug Radebaugh, Bob Hendrickson, Bruce Arena
Attack: Eamon McEneaney, Bob Griebe, Jeff Long, Tom Postel, Dave Warfield
Head Coach: Richie Moran
Assistant Coaches: Jerry Schmidt, Gene Fusting

See also
 World Lacrosse Championship
 Field lacrosse
 Federation of International Lacrosse, the unified governing body for world lacrosse founded in 2008

References

External links
 Federation of International Lacrosse
 Down Memory Lane - Canada - 1978 World Lacrosse Champions Stan Shillington
 Men's International Lacrosse History
 Dispatches from England – Team Canada and the 2010 World Lacrosse Championships
 Unearthed Video: Canada's Dramatic 1978 Lacrosse Gold July 1st 2020 Inside Lacrosse

1978
1978
World Lacrosse Championship
Sport in Stockport
1970s in Greater Manchester
World Lacrosse